Chan Peng Soon  (born 27 April 1988) is a Malaysian badminton player specialised in the mixed doubles event. He is best known for his partnership with Goh Liu Ying where they have been consistently ranked among the top 10 mixed doubles pair in the world. Chan and Goh reached a career high ranking of world number 3 in 2012 and won the silver medal at the 2016 Rio Olympics.

Career

2009–2013 
In July 2009, Chan won his first senior international title with Lim Khim Wah at the Thailand Open by defeating compatriots Choong Tan Fook and Lee Wan Wah in the final. In October 2009, Chan and Goh Liu Ying reached their first international tournament final at the Vietnam Open but were defeated by Flandy Limpele and Cheng Wen-hsing.

In April 2010, they became the country's first ever mixed doubles champions in a top-flight international tournament after winning the Badminton Asia Championships by defeating South Korean's Yoo Yeon-seong and Kim Min-jung in the final. At the 2010 Commonwealth Games, he won the gold medal in mixed team event. In the mixed doubles event, Chan and Goh lost the bronze medal match to Chayut Triyachart and Yao Lei.

In May 2011, they finished as runner-ups to Indonesian pair, Tontowi Ahmad and Lilyana Natsir in the final of the Malaysia Open. In November 2011, they won the Bitburger Open after defeating Denmark's Thomas Laybourn and Kamilla Rytter Juhl.

In March 2012, they reached the semi-finals of the All England Open before losing to the eventual champions, Tontowi Ahmad and Lilyana Natsir. In the following month, they became the runner-up of the Australia Open after losing to Chinese Taipei's Chen Hung-Ling and Cheng Wen-Hsing in the final. They gained their first ever Malaysia Open crown by beating Indonesian pair, Irfan Fadhilah and Weni Anggraini.

Chan and Goh represented Malaysia at the 2012 London Olympics. They were the first ever Malaysian mixed doubles pair to qualify for the Olympic Games. They lost all three group matches and failed to progress to quarter-finals in their Olympics debut. In September 2012, Chan and Goh won their first Super Series title at the Japan Open by beating Muhammad Rijal and Lilyana Natsir. In November 2012, they reached the final of the China Open but were defeated by top seed, Xu Chen and Ma Jin in straight sets.

In January 2013, Chan and Goh became the runner-ups of the Malaysia Open after losing to Joachim Fischer Nielsen and Christinna Pedersen in the final.

2014–2017 
In January 2014, Lai Pei Jing was chosen as his new partner while Goh went on hiatus to recover from knee surgery. In their first international competition together, Chan and Lai reached the final of Austrian International before losing to Robert Mateusiak and Agnieszka Wojtkowska.

In April 2014, Chan briefly resumed his partnership with Goh at the Singapore Open. Chan resumed his partnership with Lai after Goh decided to undergo surgery on both her knees and being out of action for the rest of the year. At the 2014 Commonwealth Games, Chan won the gold medal in the mixed team event. In the individual mixed doubles event, Chan and Lai lost the bronze medal match to Robert Blair and Imogen Bankier.

Chan resumed his partnership with Goh in 2015 where they won three titles that year: the Polish Open, Russian Open and the Mexico Open. At the 2015 Southeast Asian Games, they won a silver medal after losing to Indonesia's Praveen Jordan and Debby Susanto in the mixed doubles final.

In February 2016, they were runner-ups of the inaugural edition of Thailand Masters after losing to unseeded Chinese pair, Zheng Siwei and Chen Qingchen in the final. In March 2016, they clinched their first title of the year by winning the New Zealand Open. In April 2016, they lost to Indonesian pair, Tontowi Ahmad and Lilyana Natsir in the final of the Malaysia Open.

Goh and Chan qualified for 2016 Summer Olympics in Rio de Janeiro. They won their first two group stage matches but lost the third to Indonesian pair, Tontowi Ahmad and Liliyana Natsir. They finished as group runner-ups and progress to quarter finals round. In the quarter finals, they beat Poland's Robert Mateusiak and Nadieżda Zięba. In the semi-finals, they beat China's Xu Chen and Ma Jin in straight sets to reach the final.

In the final, they had to settle for silver medal after they were beaten by Tontowi Ahmad and Liliyana Natsir for the second time in the tournament. Despite the fact that Goh and Chan lost in the final, they had created history by being the first Malaysian mixed doubles pair to claim an Olympic medal.

In March 2017, Chan and Goh became the first Malaysian mixed doubles pair to reach the All England Open final since 1955. They were close to winning but lost to China's Lu Kai and Huang Yaqiong in rubber sets, in which a few controversial fault calls were made by the umpire against them. In April 2017, they reached the semi-finals of Indian Open but were forced to concede a walkover to Zheng Siwei and Chen Qingchen after Goh fell ill. They later suffered a first round loss to Edi Subaktiar-Gloria Emanuelle Widjaja in the Malaysia Open.

With Goh out of action due to injury, Chan was paired up with Peck Yen Wei at the Indonesian Open where they reached the semi-finals. In June 2017, he paired up with Cheah Yee See where they reached the quarter-finals of the Australian Open. In July 2017, the pair won their first career title together at the Russia Open. At the 2017 Southeast Asian Games, he won silver in the men's team and bronze in the individual mixed doubles events. In September 2017, Chan and Cheah reached the semifinal of the Korea Open before losing to Wang Yilyu and Huang Dongping.

2018–present 
In January 2018, he resumed his partnership with Goh and they won the Thailand Masters. Chan participated in the 2018 Commonwealth Games where he won the silver medal in the mixed team event. Chan and Goh reached the semifinals of the individual mixed doubles event before being defeated by Chris Adcock and Gabby Adcock. They later acquired the bronze medal by defeating Indian pair Satwiksairaj Rankireddy and Ashwini Ponnappa.

In December 2018, he announced his resignation from the Badminton Association of Malaysia (BAM) alongside his partner, Goh Liu Ying effective 1 January 2019. He also participated in the 2018–19 Malaysia Purple League representing Ampang Jaya Badminton Club by partnering temporarily with Shevon Jamie Lai. He was also a temporary coach for Tan Wee Kiong and Goh V Shem.

In July 2021, Chan with his partner Goh competed at the 2020 Summer Olympics, but were eliminated in the group stage.

On December 6, 2021, Chan announced in an Instagram post that he and Goh have decided to split up after 13 years of playing badminton together. Chan will continue his career in badminton after splitting up for good with Goh. He rejoined BAM starting from 1 January 2022. Valeree Siow was chosen as Chan's new partner and the India Open was their first tournament together. From May 2022, Chan resumed his 2017 partnership with Cheah Yee See, their first competition together being the Indonesia Open.

Personal life 
He is married to Malaysian singer Esther Cham May May since September 2010. They have four children: Milton, Hannah, Julian and Leah.

Sponsorship
In May 2019, Chan and Goh were appointed by as Yobick Malaysia brand ambassadors.

Achievements

Olympic Games 
Mixed doubles

Commonwealth Games 
Mixed doubles

Asian Championships 
Mixed doubles

Southeast Asian Games 
Mixed doubles

BWF World Tour (4 titles, 2 runners-up) 
The BWF World Tour, which was announced on 19 March 2017 and implemented in 2018, is a series of elite badminton tournaments sanctioned by the Badminton World Federation (BWF). The BWF World Tour is divided into levels of World Tour Finals, Super 1000, Super 750, Super 500, Super 300 (part of the HSBC World Tour), and the BWF Tour Super 100.

Mixed doubles

BWF Superseries (1 title, 4 runners-up) 
The BWF Superseries, which was launched on 14 December 2006 and implemented in 2007, was a series of elite badminton tournaments, sanctioned by the Badminton World Federation (BWF). BWF Superseries levels were Superseries and Superseries Premier. A season of Superseries consisted of twelve tournaments around the world that had been introduced since 2011. Successful players were invited to the Superseries Finals, which were held at the end of each year.

Mixed doubles

  BWF Superseries Finals tournament
  BWF Superseries Premier tournament
  BWF Superseries tournament

BWF Grand Prix (7 titles, 4 runners-up) 
The BWF Grand Prix had two levels, the Grand Prix and Grand Prix Gold. It was a series of badminton tournaments sanctioned by the Badminton World Federation (BWF) and played between 2007 and 2017.

Men's doubles

Mixed doubles

  BWF Grand Prix Gold tournament
  BWF Grand Prix tournament

BWF International Challenge/Series/Satellite (5 titles, 5 runners-up) 
Men's doubles

Mixed doubles

  BWF International Challenge tournament
  BWF International Series/Asian Satellite tournament

Honours 
  :
  Member of the Order of the Defender of the Realm (A.M.N.) (2017)

References

External links 

 
 
 
 
 
 

1988 births
Living people
Sportspeople from Penang
Malaysian sportspeople of Chinese descent
Malaysian male badminton players
Badminton players at the 2012 Summer Olympics
Badminton players at the 2016 Summer Olympics
Badminton players at the 2020 Summer Olympics
Olympic badminton players of Malaysia
Olympic silver medalists for Malaysia
Olympic medalists in badminton
Medalists at the 2016 Summer Olympics
Badminton players at the 2010 Commonwealth Games
Badminton players at the 2014 Commonwealth Games
Badminton players at the 2018 Commonwealth Games
Badminton players at the 2022 Commonwealth Games
Commonwealth Games gold medallists for Malaysia
Commonwealth Games silver medallists for Malaysia
Commonwealth Games bronze medallists for Malaysia
Commonwealth Games medallists in badminton
Badminton players at the 2010 Asian Games
Badminton players at the 2014 Asian Games
Badminton players at the 2018 Asian Games
Asian Games bronze medalists for Malaysia
Asian Games medalists in badminton
Medalists at the 2014 Asian Games
Competitors at the 2009 Southeast Asian Games
Competitors at the 2015 Southeast Asian Games
Competitors at the 2017 Southeast Asian Games
Southeast Asian Games silver medalists for Malaysia
Southeast Asian Games bronze medalists for Malaysia
Southeast Asian Games medalists in badminton
Members of the Order of the Defender of the Realm
Medallists at the 2010 Commonwealth Games
Medallists at the 2014 Commonwealth Games
Medallists at the 2018 Commonwealth Games
Medallists at the 2022 Commonwealth Games